The 1965 Saint Louis Billikens men's soccer team represented Saint Louis University during the 1965 NCAA soccer season. The Billikens won their fifth NCAA title this season. It was the eighth ever season the Billikens fielded a men's varsity soccer team.

Schedule 

|-
!colspan=6 style=""| Regular season
|-

|-
!colspan=6 style=""| NCAA Tournament
|-

|-

References 

 Results

Saint Louis Billikens men's soccer seasons
1965 NCAA soccer independents season
Saint Louis
NCAA Division I Men's Soccer Tournament-winning seasons
NCAA Division I Men's Soccer Tournament College Cup seasons